is a district located in Sōya Subprefecture, Hokkaido, Japan.  The district and town both cover the island of the same name: Rebun Island.

As of 2004, the district has an estimated population of 3,573 and a density of 43.93 persons per km2. The total area is 81.33 km2.

Towns and villages
Rebun

External links

Districts in Hokkaido